is a Japanese field hockey player. She competed for the Japan women's national field hockey team at the 2016 Summer Olympics.

References

External links
 

1996 births
Living people
People from Kishiwada, Osaka
Japanese female field hockey players
Olympic field hockey players of Japan
Field hockey players at the 2016 Summer Olympics
Field hockey players at the 2014 Summer Youth Olympics
Field hockey players at the 2018 Asian Games
Asian Games gold medalists for Japan
Asian Games medalists in field hockey
Medalists at the 2018 Asian Games